Brownieside is a hamlet in Northumberland, in England. It is situated between Alnwick and Berwick-upon-Tweed, on the A1 a short distance to the north of North Charlton.

From what people know from living there the Spriggs family home in the centre of the hamlet started off as a coach house and then the Masons Arms pub and when the Spriggs bought the house they decided to open up coach house B&B that closed in 2018. The house is 165 years old.

Governance 
Brownieside is in the parliamentary constituency of Berwick-upon-Tweed.

References

Hamlets in Northumberland